The Alaska Republican Party is the affiliate of the Republican Party in Alaska, headquartered in Anchorage.

It is currently the favored party in the state, controlling both of Alaska's U.S. Senate seats, the Alaska House of Representatives, and the governorship. Republican presidential nominees have won Alaska in recent elections; the last and only Democrat to carry Alaska was Lyndon B. Johnson in 1964.

History

The Alaska Republican Party originates from Alaska's first district governor. Once Alaska was granted the status of United States District civilian leadership could be appointed by the current president of the United States. President Chester A. Arthur appointed Alaska's first territorial governor. He was a Republican named John Henry Kinkead.

Martha Ried of Petersberg was the Chair of the Republican Party of Alaska.

Alaska Republicans as a party organization can trace their origin to Alaska's first legislature in 1913.

After Republican Senator Lisa Murkowski voted to impeach Donald Trump over his role in inciting a pro-Trump mob to attack the U.S. Capitol, the Alaska Republican Party censured her, called for her resignation, and endorsed challenger Kelly Tshibaka against her in the Republican primary in 2022.

Organization

Current elected officials

Members of Congress

U.S. Senate

U.S. House of Representatives
None

Results

Presidential

Gubernatorial

See also

 Alaska Democratic Party
 Political party strength in Alaska

Notes

References

External links
Alaska Republican Party website
Alaska Federation of Republican Women

Political parties in Alaska
Alaska